Lucky is an American dark comedy television series which ran for one season on FX in 2003. The show starred John Corbett as Michael "Lucky" Linkletter, a professional poker player and gambling addict. The series was created by Robb Cullen and Mark Cullen. It was nominated for the 2003 Primetime Emmy Award for Outstanding Writing in a Comedy Series.

Cast

Main 
 John Corbett as Michael "Lucky" Linkletter
 Craig Robinson as Buddy "Mutha" LeGendre
 Billy Gardell as Vincent "Vinny" Sticcarelli

Supporting 
 Ever Carradine as Theresa "Terry" Phillips
 Andrea Roth as Amy
 Kevin Breznahan as Danny Martin
 Seymour Cassel as Victor "The Trake" Fleming
 Dan Hedaya as Joey Legs
 Steve Troisi as Benny The Bartender
 Robb Cullen as Stan McWatt
 Mitch Lord as Brother Love

Episodes

External links 
 

2000s American black comedy television series
2003 American television series debuts
2003 American television series endings
FX Networks original programming
Television series created by the Cullen Brothers
Television shows about poker
Television shows set in the Las Vegas Valley
Poker in North America